Pronounced Jah-Nay is the debut studio album by American R&B group Zhané. It was released on February 15, 1994, via Motown. Recording sessions took place at Enterprise Studios and at Encore Studios in Burbank, at Marion Recording Studio in Fairview, New Jersey, and at Unique Recording Studios and at Soundtrack Studios in New York City. Production was handled by Naughty by Nature and Zhané. The album peaked at number thirty-seven on the Billboard 200 and number eight on the Top R&B Albums chart. It was certified platinum by the Recording Industry Association of America on October 4, 1996.

The album produced five singles: "Hey Mr. D.J.", "Groove Thang", "Sending My Love", "Vibe" and "You're Sorry Now". Its lead single, "Hey Mr. D.J.", became the group's most successful song, reaching number six on the Billboard Hot 100 and receiving gold certification by the RIAA.

Critical reception
Music & Media wrote, "The concept this female duo–Renee Neufville and Jean Norris–practises is relatively new. Blending sweet soul music with hip hop rhythm tracks, the outcome is not unlike "Sons Of Soul" Tony! Toni! Tone!. Compared to their own streetwise rap records, producers Naughty By Nature were very smooth operators in the studio for this one. Apart from the two singles "Hey Mr. D.J." and "Groove Thang" the beat is rather slow. Pronounce "Ge-nius," we say sans gene."

Track listing

Sample credits
Track 1 contains a sample from "Lookin' Up to You" performed by Michael Wycoff
Track 3 contains a sample from "Love X Love" performed by George Benson

Personnel

Renée Neufville – vocals, lyrics (tracks: 1, 3-11, 13), piano (track 8), strings (track 12), producer (tracks: 6, 8, 9, 12), executive producer
Jean Norris – vocals, lyrics & producer (tracks: 10, 12), keyboards (track 10), piano (track 12), executive producer
Keir "Kay Gee" Gist – vocals (track 2), drum programming (tracks: 6–8, 10, 13), executive producer
Wendell & Face – vocals (track 2)
Les – additional vocals (track 3)
Voe Harris – keyboards (track 3)
Naheem "Pop Holiday" Bowens – keyboards (track 3)
David Bellochio – keyboards (tracks: 4, 5, 7, 8), piano (track 9), additional producer (tracks: 4, 5), co-producer (track 7), recording (tracks: 1–8, 10–13)
Alan Goldsher – bass (track 9)
Steve Williams – drums (track 9)
Frank Gravis – bass (track 10)
Paul Levant – guitar (track 10)
Kevin Batchelor – trumpet (track 10)
Naughty by Nature – producers (tracks: 1–8, 10, 11, 13)
Craig King – co-producer (track 6)
Angela Piva – recording (tracks: 1–8, 10–14), mixing (tracks: 1–7, 9-14)
John Van Nest – mixing (track 8)
Frank Fagnano – recording (track 9)
Quincy Jones III – remixing (track 13)
Ed Miller – recording assistant
Fred Kelly – recording assistant
John Buttigieg – recording assistant
Mufi – recording assistant
Rob Polhemus – recording assistant
Scott Blockland – recording assistant
Scott Canto – recording assistant
Steve McKeever – executive producer, liner notes
Jonathan Clark – art direction
Shauna Woods – design
James Minchin III – photography

Charts

Weekly charts

Year-end charts

Singles

Certifications

References

External links

Zhané albums
Motown albums
1994 debut albums
Albums produced by KayGee